Deze wereld is van jou is the debut studio album by Dutch artist Gers Pardoel. It was released on 14 October 2011 through TopNotch.

Track listing

Charts and certifications

Weekly charts

Year-end charts

Certifications

References

2011 albums
Gers Pardoel albums
Nederpop